TVPaint Animation (also known as TVPaint, TVP, Bauhaus Mirage or NewTek Aura) is a 2D paint and digital animation software package developed by TVPaint Developpement SARL based in Lorraine, France. Originally released for Amiga in 1991, version 3.0 (1994) introduced support for other platforms. In 1999, the last Amiga version 3.59 was released as free download. TVPaint Animation currently runs on Mac, Windows, Linux, and Android operating systems.

Notable uses

Feature films
My Dog Tulip, a 2009 American animated feature film by Paul Fierlinger and Sandra Fierlinger made with TVPaint Animation
Song of the Sea, a 2014 Irish Oscar-nominated animated feature film from Cartoon Saloon,  directed by Tomm Moore
Mune: Guardian of the Moon, a 2015 French 3D computer-animated adventure fantasy film directed by Benoît Philippon and Alexandre Heboyan; 2D animated clips were made with TVPaint to coincide with the dominant computer-animation technique for the film.
The Peanuts Movie, a 2015 American 3D computer-animated comedy film (with 2D animation sequences animated with TVPaint) produced by Blue Sky Studios
The Breadwinner, a 2017 Oscar-nominated animated film by Cartoon Saloon, directed by Nora Twomey and executive produced by Angelina Jolie.
Kurt Cobain: Montage of Heck, a 2015 Emmy-nominated documentary directed by Brett Morgen with large animated sequences by a team led by Hisko Hulsing and animation by Stefan Nadelman
The Red Turtle, a 2016 Oscar-nominated animated feature film directed by Michael Dudok de Wit coproduced by numerous European studios and studio Ghibli, all the hand drawn animation was done in TVPaint.
Ethel & Ernest, a 2016 animated feature directed by Roger Mainwood , based on the book by Raymond Briggs, produced by Lupus Films.
Ernest et Célestine - Le Voyage en Charabie, 2022 sequel to the film Ernest et Célestine (2012), directed by Jean-Christophe Roger and Julien Chheng.
 Wolfwalkers,  2020 animated feature film from Cartoon Saloon, directed by Tomm Moore and Ross Stewart.
 My Father's Dragon, 2022 animated feature film from Cartoon Saloon, directed by Nora Twomey.

Short films

Adam and Dog, a 2011 American Oscar-nominated animated short
How To Eat Your Apple, a 2011 animated short film made with TVPaint Animation, by Erick Oh.
Late Afternoon, a 2017 Irish Oscar-nominated animated short by Cartoon Saloon
We're Going On A Bear Hunt, a 2016 British animated television special (30-minutes) by Lupus Films.
Bird Karma, a 2018 American animated short by DreamWorks Animation
Animal Behaviour, 2018 animated short film by Alison Snowden & David Fine , produced at the National Film Board of Canada. The film was a multiple award winner at various film festivals. It was nominated for Best Short Animated Film at the 2019 Academy Awards.   
Weekends, 2017 (released in 2018) animated short film by Trevor Jimenez.  The film was a nominee for the Academy Award for Best Animated Short Film at the 91st Academy Awards.
The Tiger Who Came To Tea, a 2019 British animated television special (23-minutes) by Lupus Films.
Kitbull, a 2019 Oscar-nominated American animated short produced by Pixar Animation Studios
Burrow, a 2020 American Oscar-nominated animated short produced by Pixar Animation Studios
If Anything Happens I Love You, 2020 animated short film Michael Govier & Will McCormack. At the 93rd Academy Awards it won the Academy Award for Best Animated Short Film.  
Opera, 2020 animated short film by Erick Oh. In 2021, the film was nominated for an Academy Award for Best Animated Short Film. 
Mum Is Pouring Rain, a 2021 French animated short film produced by Laïdak Films written by Hugo de Faucompret and Lison d'Andréa and directed by Hugo de Faucompret. The film won the Jury Prize in the Special TV category at the Annecy International Animated Film Festival the same year.
The Boy, the Mole, the Fox and the Horse (2022, 32 mins.) directed by Peter Baynton and Charlie Mackesy (from the book by Mackesy) The film won the Academy Award for Best Animated Short Film at the 95th Academy Awards ceremony.

TV and Web series

C'est Bon, a French animated series produced by Folimage
Simon's Cat, a British animated web cartoon and book series by Simon Tofield. It was created using Adobe Flash, and TVPaint was used in the episodes Scaredy Cat, Snow Cat and in the Off to the vet special.
 Gigglebug, originally an iPad app made by Anima Boutique; a Finnish animated series, that first aired in April 2016
PIG: The Dam Keeper Poems, a 2017 series based on the 2014 Oscar-nominated short The Dam Keeper directed by Erick Oh for Tonko House, which debuted on Hulu Japan on October 6, 2017
Samurai Jack, Season 5 (2017) The fifth and final season of Samurai Jack, an American animated series, premiered on Adult Swim's Toonami, directed by Genndy Tartakovsky .
Undone, animated series for Amazon Prime directed by Hisko Hulsing
Primal, animated series created and directed by Genndy Tartakovsky for Adult Swim.
Hazbin Hotel, animated series by Vivienne Medrano.
Helluva Boss, spin-off of Hazbin Hotel, animated series by Vivienne Medrano.

See also
 Flash animation

References

External links
 
TVPaint 3.59 for Amiga

Animation software
2D animation software
C++ software
Graphics software
Raster graphics editors
MacOS graphics software
Windows graphics-related software
Raster graphics editors for Linux
Software companies of France
Amiga software
Proprietary software